Douglas State Forest is a publicly owned forest with recreational features located in the town of Douglas, Massachusetts, bordering both Connecticut and Rhode Island. The state forest's  include Wallum Lake and a rare Atlantic white cedar swamp,  of which are designated as a Massachusetts Wildland. The forest is managed by the Massachusetts Department of Conservation and Recreation.

History
In the 1930s, the Civilian Conservation Corps installed major improvements including a picnic pavilion, an administrative  building, and water management infrastructure.

Activities and amenities
Forest trails are used for hiking, biking, horseback riding, and cross-country skiing. A  section of the  Midstate Trail runs through the forest as does a portion of the  Southern New England Trunkline Trail. At the southwest extreme of the park, the tri-state marker, where Connecticut, Massachusetts and Rhode Island are conjoined, may be reached by a short offshoot of the Mid-State Trail.

Wallum Lake offers fishing, swimming, and boating. The forest also offers picnicking, restricted hunting, and a group day-use area.

References

External links

Douglas State Forest Department of Conservation and Recreation 
Douglas State Forest Trail Map Department of Conservation and Recreation

Massachusetts state forests
Protected areas of Worcester County, Massachusetts
Civilian Conservation Corps in Massachusetts
1934 establishments in Massachusetts
Protected areas established in 1934
Douglas, Massachusetts